Mirbelia longifolia is a species of flowering plant in the family Fabaceae and is endemic to the south-west of Western Australia. It was first formally described in 1942 by Charles Gardner in the Journal of the Royal Society of Western Australia. The specific epithet (longifolia) means "long-leaved". This mirbelia grows on stony soil in the Avon Wheatbelt, Geraldton Sandplains and Yalgoo bioregions of south-western Western Australia, and is listed as "not threatened" by the Government of Western Australia Department of Biodiversity, Conservation and Attractions.

References

Mirbelioids
longifolia
Fabales of Australia
Flora of Western Australia
Plants described in 1943
Taxa named by Charles Gardner